Abdiel is a Hebrew name.

Abdiel may also refer to:

 , several destroyers and minelayers of Royal Navy
 Abdiel-class minelayer, a class of six fast minelayers commissioned into the Royal Navy

See also 
 Abdullah (disambiguation)
 Obadiah (disambiguation)